Misbun Ramdan bin Mohmed Misbun (born 1 March 1991) is a Malaysian professional badminton player. He is the son of former Malaysian international badminton player Misbun Sidek.

Career
Misbun Ramdan won his first local title by upsetting Mohd Arif Abdul Latif, 21–18, 21–18 in the men’s singles final of the 2012 Pahang Open. In the same year, he won his first national title by defeating Chong Wei Feng to become the new national champion.

In January 2013, Ramdan left Badminton Association of Malaysia (BAM) to train under his father, Misbun Sidek. In April 2014, Ramdan was invited by BAM for the selection trials of Thomas Cup. At the selection trial, he lost 21–19, 21–15 to Goh Soon Huat.

In 2015, Ramdan suffered an Achilles heel rupture that kept him from competing for almost 2 years. He came back in February 2017 to compete in the National Championships and reached the singles final. He eventually lost to defending champion Lim Chi Wing.

Achievements

Asia Junior Championships
Boys' Singles

BWF International Challenge/Series 
Men's singles

  BWF International Challenge tournament
  BWF International Series tournament

References

External links
 

1991 births
Living people
Sportspeople from Kuala Lumpur
Malaysian people of Malay descent
Malaysian Muslims
Malaysian male badminton players